Tyler Crumley (born 18 January 2007) is an American actor. He is best known for his appearance as Jonah Rayfield in the episode These Old Bones of the Netflix original series Dolly Parton's Heartstrings, starring Kathleen Turner. The series has been nominated for Outstanding Television Movie at the 72nd Primetime Emmy Awards in 2020.

Life and work
Crumley was born in Austell, Georgia. In 2019, Tyler appeared in Godzilla: King of the Monsters as the young Andrew Russell, son of Mark (Kyle Chandler) and Emma (played by Vera Farmiga), and brother to Madison (played by Millie Bobby Brown).

In 2020, Crumley appeared in Steven Spielberg's reboot of Amazing Stories for Apple TV+. He stars in the leading role of Dylan in "Dynoman and The Volt", the grandson of the late Robert Forster. In the same year, Tyler appeared as Andy O'Doyle in the Adam Sandler Netflix comedy Hubie Halloween, a character from Sandler's Billy Madison; both films were produced by Happy Madison Productions.

Filmography

Film

Television

Video games

References

External links 
 
 

Living people
2007 births
People from Austell, Georgia
21st-century American male actors
American male child actors
American male film actors
American male television actors